Sierra Leone competed at the 2019 African Games held from 19 to 31 August 2019 in Rabat, Morocco.

Athletics 

Sierra Leone competed in several events in athletics.

Julius Morie and Alpha Breezy Kamara competed in the men's 100 metres event. Neither of them qualified to compete in the semifinals.

Fatmata Awolo and Elma Sesay competed in the women's 100 metres event. Neither of them qualified to compete in the semifinals.

Maggie Barrie competed in the women's 200 metres and women's 400 metres events. In the 200 metres event she advanced to compete in the final and in the 400 metres event she reached the semifinals.

Maggie Barrie, Elma Sesay, Fatmata Awolo, Mary Thomas Tarawally competed in the women's 4 × 400 metres relay event. They finished in 7th place.

Boxing 

John Browne, Deedra Arvella Chestnut, Zainab Keita and Samuel Kamara represented Sierra Leone in boxing.

Chess 

Sierra Leone competed in the men's blitz individual and men's rapid individual events. Sierra Leone was also scheduled to compete in the mixed team event but ultimately did not compete in that event.

Judo 

Frederick Harris and Christian Bangura were scheduled to compete in judo but did not compete in any events.

Karate 

Victor Amara Jr (men's kata individual) and Abubakarr Kamara (men's kumite -60kg) represented Sierra Leone in karate.

Swimming 

Joshua Jonathan Julius Wyse and Isha Kanu competed in swimming.

Wyse competed in the men's 50 metre butterfly and men's 50 metre freestyle events. Kanu competed in the women's 50 metre breaststroke and women's 50 metre freestyle events.

Tennis 

Bassie Sorie Kargbo competed in the men's singles event. He won his first match against Gideon Van Dyk and in his second match he was eliminated by Aziz Dougaz.

Kargbo and Amadu Bangura also competed in the men's doubles event. They advanced to the second round where they were eliminated by Benjamin Lock and Courtney John Lock (representing Zimbabwe).

Fudia Kargbo competed in the women's singles event. She competed against Barakat Quadre and she did not advance to the next match.

Volleyball 

Sierra Leone competed in beach volleyball in both the men's tournament and women's tournament.

Ishmail Bangura and John Sorie Kamara competed in the men's tournament and Gladys Mabinty Fofana and Francess Lansana competed in the women's tournament.

Wrestling 

Three athletes represented Sierra Leone in wrestling.

Men's freestyle

Men's Greco-Roman

Women's freestyle

References 

Nations at the 2019 African Games
2019
African Games